Kanemitsu (written: 金光) is a Japanese surname. Notable people with the surname include:

 Matsumi Kanemitsu (1922–1992), Japanese-American painter
 , Japanese businessman and politician
 Yaichihyōe Kanemitsu (1892–1966), Japanese judoka

See also 
 Kanemitsu Bakery, a bakery of Hawaii, United States

Japanese-language surnames